Marhouma is a village in the commune of Tamtert, in El Ouata District, Béchar Province, Algeria. It is notable for nearby rock engravings.

References

Neighbouring towns and cities

Populated places in Béchar Province
Saharan rock art